Hoconuco Alto is a barrio in the municipality of San Germán, Puerto Rico. Its population in 2010 was 572.

History
Puerto Rico was ceded by Spain in the aftermath of the Spanish–American War under the terms of the 1898 Treaty of Paris and became an unincorporated territory of the United States. In 1899, the United States Department of War conducted a census of Puerto Rico finding that the population of Hoconuco Alto barrio was 943.

Features
PR-361 is in Hoconuco Alto barrio.

See also

 List of communities in Puerto Rico

References

Barrios of San Germán, Puerto Rico